This is a list of Chinese administrative divisions in order of their total resident populations. It includes all provinces, autonomous regions, direct-controlled municipalities and special administrative regions controlled by the Republic of China (1912–1949) or the People's Republic of China (1949–present). For the Republic of China after 1949, see List of administrative divisions of Taiwan.

Census data

Current population

References

Footnotes

Sources

Population
Population
Demographic lists
China, population